Sorolopha semiculta is a moth of the family Tortricidae. It is found in Thailand, Taiwan, India, Sri Lanka and the Solomon Islands.

Adults are brownish grey. The hindwings are deep fuscous bronze on the posterior half, becoming fuscous grey with purplish veins on the anterior half.

References

Moths described in 1909
Olethreutini
Moths of Asia